Sultan Abu al-'Ila Mosque is one of the most famous mosques in Islamic Cairo in Egypt. The mosque now bases on 23 pure white marble columns. The platform is a masterpiece made of Indian teak. The roof is plated in gold leaf with amazing tiny trappings. Inside walls and domes are decorated with Islamic-colored inscriptions. The dome at the outside like all Mamluks' age is made of stone.

Born in Mecca in the late 8th-century CE, Sultan Abu al-'Ila moved to Egypt to be near Ahl al-Bayt.

See also
 Islam in Egypt

References

Mosques in Cairo
Mamluk architecture in Egypt
Medieval Cairo
Mosque buildings with domes